The Carnival Is Back or The Carnival Is Here Again (Italian: È tornato carnevale) is a 1937 Italian "white-telephones" comedy film directed by Raffaello Matarazzo and starring Armando Falconi, Clara Tabody and Franco Coop. The film was based on a popular stage play in which Falconi had previously starred. It is now considered a lost film.

It was shot at the Cines Studios in Rome and on location in the capital city and around the Gulf of Naples. The film's sets were designed by the art director Gastone Medin.

Cast
 Armando Falconi as Il duca Gualtiero di Fogliaverde  
 Clara Tabody as Kay  
 Franco Coop as Gennariello, servitore del duca  
 Mario Pisu as Fausto, il pittore  
 Nicola Maldacea as Romeo  
 Dora Menichelli as La contessa di Mont-Marsan  
 Hilda Springher as Concettina  
 Celeste Almieri as La marchesa di Pigna  
 Ugo Ceseri as Prosperone Lauria  
 Albino Principe as Max  
 Armando Anselmo as Il marchese di Pigna  
 Ornella Da Vasto 
 Lia Rosa 
 Rolando Costantino

References

Bibliography 
 Aprà, Adriano. The Fabulous Thirties: Italian cinema 1929-1944. Electa International, 1979.

External links 

1937 films
Italian comedy films
Italian black-and-white films
1937 comedy films
1930s Italian-language films
Films directed by Raffaello Matarazzo
Lost Italian films
Cines Studios films
1930s Italian films

it:È tornato carnevale